Azhakiya Ravanan (Handsome Ravanan) is a 1996 Indian Malayalam-language romantic comedy-drama film directed by Kamal and written by Sreenivasan. The film has an ensemble cast of Mammootty, Bhanupriya, Sreenivasan, Innocent, Biju Menon, Rajan P. Dev, and Cochin Haneefa. Former child artist Kavya Madhavan portrayed Anuradha's younger self. The move was produced by V. P. Madhavan Nair under the banner of Murali Films, while the music was composed by Vidyasagar, his debut Malayalam movie. The 2015 film Chirakodinja Kinavukal is a spin-off to this film.

However, upon the film's release, it turned out to be a flop at the box-office, but the songs became chartbusters. Mammootty, in several interviews, had revealed that no other failures have made him as sad as the failure of this movie at the box-office.

Plot
Shankar Das is a millionaire businessman who returns to his native village in Alappuzha. No one in the village is aware of his past. During his childhood he was a servant of the local feudal lord Chatothu Panickar. He left the job after getting severely punished for kissing the lord's young daughter. He fled to Mumbai and there he became a successful businessman.

Now he has returned to his native village incognito. He is a very boastful man and revels in the praises showered on him by the sycophants. He reveals his identity to Ambujakshan, who is his childhood friend and an aspiring writer. He also confides in him his interest for Panicker's daughter Anuradha, who was his childhood infatuation. Ambujakshan succeeds in convincing Shankar to produce a film by telling him that it would help him to earn the respect of the villagers and win over Anuradha. Thus the production of the film starts under the direction of Sharath, who is the love interest of Anuradha.

Shankar renders unsolicited financial help to Panicker's family. But, Shankar later realizes about the love developing between Anuradha and Sharath the film director and that leads to a pause on the film's production. Later, Shankar proposes marriage to Anuradha, which she declines. However, the family, which is indebted to him, coerces her to marry him. Anuradha, who is infuriated, decides that she will not present herself as a virgin before Shankar and makes love with Sharath. After the marriage she learns from Shankar that Sharath had accepted money from him for not creating any trouble for their marriage. This causes another heartbreak for her and she confesses about her relationship with Sharath to Shankar. In the end Shankar embraces Anuradha and their marital relationship resumes.

Cast

Soundtrack

This movie marked Vidyasagar's entry into Malayalam films. He won Kerala State Film Award for Best Music Director for his songs.

Awards
Kerala State Film Awards
 Best Lyricist - Kaithapram Damodaran Namboothiri 
 Best Music Director - Vidyasagar
 Best Female Singer - Sujatha Mohan

References

External links
 

1990s Malayalam-language films
Indian romantic comedy-drama films
Films shot in Alappuzha
Films shot in Mumbai
Films with screenplays by Sreenivasan
$Ambuj1
Films directed by Kamal (director)
Films scored by Vidyasagar